Harold Joseph Bevan Jr. (November 15, 1930 – October 5, 1968) was an American professional baseball player.

A longtime minor league first baseman, catcher and third baseman, he was a pinch hitter and backup third baseman in Major League Baseball who had brief trials for the Boston Red Sox (1952), Philadelphia / Kansas City Athletics (1952, 1955), and Cincinnati Reds (1961). His cousin George Strickland was a Major League shortstop, coach and manager.

Bevan's playing career was plagued by serious injuries. A broken leg curtailed his  rookie season, a hand injury hampered his final MLB trial with the  Reds, and he also broke his jaw and an ankle and was seriously beaned during his minor league career.

In parts of three Major League seasons, Bevan was a .292 hitter with a home run and five RBI in 15 games played. His home run, a solo shot, came as a pinch hitter off Vinegar Bend Mizell of the Pittsburgh Pirates on May 12, 1961. The following day, Bevan made his final Major League appearance, striking out as a pinch hitter against another Pirate left-hander, Joe Gibbon. He was sent to the Triple-A Jersey City Jerseys on May 18. Despite his brief term with the team, he was featured in Cincinnati relief pitcher Jim Brosnan's memoir of the Reds' 1961 season, Pennant Race. During his long minor league career (1948–51; 1953–62), Bevan compiled a batting average of .295 with 1,618 hits and 90 home runs. He led the Venezuelan Winter League with a .351 average in the 1954–55 season.

Bevan died from a kidney infection in his native New Orleans at the age of 37. At the time of his death, he was a scout for the Atlanta Braves.

References

External links

Baseball Almanac
Retrosheet
Nowlin, Bill, Hal Bevan, Society for American Baseball Research Biography Project
Venezuelan Professional Baseball League statistics

1930 births
1968 deaths
American expatriate baseball players in Cuba
American expatriate baseball players in Venezuela
American people of Welsh descent
Atlanta Braves scouts
Baseball players from New Orleans
Boston Red Sox players
Cincinnati Reds players
Columbus Jets players
Deaths from kidney disease
Havana Sugar Kings players
Indianapolis Indians players
Jersey City Jerseys players
Kansas City Athletics players
Leones del Caracas players
Major League Baseball third basemen
Modesto Reds players
New Orleans Pelicans (baseball) players
Ottawa A's players
Patriotas de Venezuela players
Philadelphia Athletics players
Rehoboth Beach Pirates players
San Diego Padres (minor league) players
Seattle Rainiers players
Waco Pirates players